Delta Arae, Latinized from δ Arae, is the Bayer designation for a double star in the southern constellation Ara. It has an apparent visual magnitude of 3.62 and is visible to the naked eye. Based upon an annual parallax of 16.48 mas, it is about  distant from the Earth.

Delta Arae is massive B-type main sequence star with a stellar classification of B8 Vn. The 'n' suffix indicates the absorption lines are spread out broadly because the star is spinning rapidly. It has a projected rotational velocity of 255 km/s, resulting in an equatorial bulge with a radius 13% larger than the polar radius. It has a magnitude 9.5 companion G-type main sequence star that may form a binary star system with Delta Arae.

There is a 12th magnitude optical companion located 47.4 arcseconds away along a position angle of 313°.

Etymology

Allen erroneously called both Delta and Zeta Arae "Tseen Yin". He probably confused the constellation "Ara" with "Ari", as 天陰 is actually in Aries.

See also 
 Ara (Chinese astronomy) 
 Aries (Chinese astronomy)

References

Further reading 
  (1987): , pp. 312, 328.

External links 
 HR 6500
 AEEA (Activities of Exhibition and Education in Astronomy) 天文教育資訊網 2006 年 7 月 1 日

Double stars
Arae, Delta
158094
085727
6500
Ara (constellation)
B-type main-sequence stars
Durchmusterung objects